The British Block Cairn (Ed0p-1) is located on the Suffield Block in Alberta, Canada.  In the summers of 1961 and 1962, the Chief Superintendent of the Suffield Experimental Station, Mr. A. M. Pennie, granted crews from the Glenbow Foundation, consisting of R.G. Forbis, D. R. King, Frank O'Leary, Kenneth Smith, John Miller, and James Farmilo, access to the cairn.  Dating from around 1400 C.E, the site consists of a large boulder cairn surrounded by a ring of stones and a human effigy figure.

References 

National Historic Sites in Alberta
Aboriginal National Historic Sites of Canada
Cypress County
Provincial Historic Resources of Alberta
Stone circles
Archaeological sites in Alberta